Kinross RFC is a rugby union club based in Kinross, Scotland.

History

It was founded in 1981.

The club often organised a half marathon race or a 5 kilometre race to raise funds for the club.

The side have an annual charity match against the Edinburgh Borderers.

The club are hosting a dinner dance as part of the celebrations for their 40th anniversary year.

Senior training is held on Tuesday and Thursday evenings at the King George V Recreation Ground, in inclement weather training is held indoors at the Loch Leven Community Campus.

Sides

Kinross runs various sides including mens, boys, girls, midis and minis.

Honours

 Caledonia Midlands Bowl
 Champions (1): 2019-20

References

Rugby union in Perth and Kinross
Scottish rugby union teams